Paths of Death and Angels is a 1991 Hungarian drama film directed by Zoltán Kamondi. It was screened in the Un Certain Regard section at the 1991 Cannes Film Festival.

Cast
 Enikő Eszenyi - Ilona
 Rudolf Hrušínský - Schrevek József
 Gregory Hlady - Schrevek István (as Grigorij Gladyij)
 István Dégi - Árpi
 Gábor Reviczky - Boldizsár Tamás és Nagy Károly
 Eszter Csákányi
 Frigyes Hollósi
 Edit Illés - Jolán
 Anikó Für - Gina

References

External links

1991 films
Hungarian drama films
1990s Hungarian-language films
1991 drama films
Films directed by Zoltán Kamondi